Artemis Cooper, Lady Beevor FRSL (born Alice Clare Antonia Opportune Cooper; 22 April 1953) is a British writer, primarily of biographies.  She is married to historian Sir Antony Beevor.

Family life

She is the only daughter of  The 2nd Viscount Norwich (better known as John Julius Norwich) and his first wife, Anne (née Clifford), and a paternal granddaughter of Duff and Diana Cooper. She has a brother, the Hon. Jason Charles Duff Bede Cooper, and a half-sister, Allegra Huston, the only child of Lord Norwich and Enrica Soma (then-estranged wife of American film director John Huston).

Cooper attended the French Lycee, the Convent of the Sacred Heart in Woldingham and Camden School for Girls. She then went to St Hugh's College, Oxford and obtained a degree in English language and literature. 

In July 2015, she was awarded an honorary doctorate from the University of York.

She spent time in Egypt with Voluntary Service Overseas teaching English at the University of Alexandria. She has also lived in America, mostly in New Mexico.

In 1986, Artemis Cooper married fellow writer and historian Antony Beevor. The couple have two children.

Writing career
Cooper's first book was a collection of the letters of her grandmother, Lady Diana Cooper.

When her biography of Patrick Leigh Fermor appeared in 2012, it was serialised on BBC Radio 4. It was followed in September 2013 by The Broken Road, effectively the third volume of Leigh Fermor's memoir of his walking trip from the Hook of Holland to Istanbul in the 1930s.

Cooper was elected a Fellow of the Royal Society of Literature in 2017.

Bibliography

Books

U.S. edition: 
 The Diana Cooper Scrapbook (Hamish Hamilton, 1987)
 Cairo in the War, 1939-1945 (Hamish Hamilton, 1989)
 Watching in the Dark: A Child's Fight for Life (John Murray, 1992; a memoir of her daughter's childhood illness)
 Writing at the Kitchen Table: The Authorized Biography of Elizabeth David (Penguin Books Ltd, 2004; paperback ed.)
 Paris After the Liberation, 1944-1949 (Hamish Hamilton, 1994; Penguin Books, 2007; written with her husband, Antony Beevor)
Paris despues de la liberación 1944-1949 (2004, Spanish translation)
 Words of Mercury (John Murray, 2003; Patrick Leigh Fermor & Artemis Cooper)
 Patrick Leigh Fermor: An Adventure (John Murray, 2012)
 Elizabeth Jane Howard: A Dangerous Innocence (John Murray, 2016)

Editor
 Tango (Thames & Hudson, 1995; ed. Simon Collier, Artemis Cooper, Maria Susana Azzi, and Richard Martin)
 Mr Wu and Mrs Stitch: The Letters of Evelyn Waugh and Diana Cooper (ed. Artemis Cooper)
  Patrick Leigh Fermor. The Broken Road: From the Iron Gates to Mount Athos (ed. Artemis Cooper and Colin Thubron) (John Murray, 2013)

References

External links

English editors
British women editors
British women historians
Daughters of viscounts
Wives of knights
1953 births
Living people
Place of birth missing (living people)
20th-century English historians
20th-century English women writers
21st-century English historians
21st-century English writers
21st-century English women writers
British people of New Zealand descent
Fellows of the Royal Society of Literature